The Confederation of Autonomous Trade Unions of Serbia (CATUS; , SSS) is a trade union federation in Serbia.

The federation was established as a successor to the Confederation of Trade Unions of Yugoslavia (SSJ).  Although covering only Serbia, it inherited the assets of its predecessor, and most of the former's affiliates transferred over.  It became generally supportive of Slobodan Milosevic's policies, and was granted a dominant role in collective bargaining during his leadership.  In 1999, the federation concluded an agreement with the Milosevic government that its members would receive fuel at subsidised rates during the winter.

After Milosevic fell from power, the federation's leadership changed, with Milenko Smiljanic becoming its president.  It began campaigning more strongly against social and economic policies which it opposed.  By 2005, it claimed 850,000 members.

The federation had an affiliate, the Autonomous Confederation of Trade Unions of Kosovo and Metochia, representing Serbian workers in Kosovo.

External links

References

Trade unions in Serbia
Trade unions established in the 1990s